Anna of the Five Towns is a 1985 British television drama series which first aired on BBC 2. It is an adaptation by John Harvey of the 1902 novel of the same title by Arnold Bennett.

Cast
 Lynsey Beauchamp as Anna Tellwright (4 episodes)
 Anne Blackman as  Beatrice Sutton (4 episodes)
 Katie Carey as Agnes Tellwright (4 episodes)
 Anna Cropper as Mrs. Sutton (4 episodes) 
 Peter Davison as  Henry Mynors (4 episodes) 
 Emrys James as Ephraim Tellwright (4 episodes)
 John Bott as  Rev. Banks (3 episodes)
 Edward Kelsey as Titus Price (3 episodes)
 Anton Lesser as  Willie Price (3 episodes)
 Hilary Mason as  Sarah Vodrey (3 episodes)
 Barrie Cookson as  Mr. Sutton (2 episodes)
 Patricia Marks as Miss Dickinson (2 episodes
 Iain Ormsby-Knox as Policeman (2 episodes)
 Georgia Allen as Milkmaid (1 episode) 
 Wilfred Grove as Revivalist (1 episode)
 John Lancaster as Searcher (1 episode)
 Geoffrey Larder as Coroner (1 episode)  
 Michael Lees as  Mr. Lovatt (1 episode)
 Bruce Purchase as  Tom Kelly (1 episode) 
 Chris Sanders as  Dr. Henderson (1 episode)
 Keith Smith as  Bank clerk (1 episode)

References

Bibliography
Ellen Baskin. Serials on British Television, 1950-1994. Scolar Press, 1996.

External links
 

BBC television dramas
1985 British television series debuts
1985 British television series endings
1980s British drama television series
1980s British television miniseries
English-language television shows
Television shows based on British novels